The Ordnance QF 13-pounder (quick-firing) field gun was the standard equipment of the British and Canadian Royal Horse Artillery at the outbreak of World War I.

History 

The QF 13-pounder was developed as a response to combat experience gained in the Boer War and entered service in 1904, replacing the Ehrhard QF 15-pounder and BL 12-pounder 6 cwt. It was intended as a rapid-firing and highly-mobile, yet reasonably powerful, field gun for Royal Horse Artillery (RHA) batteries supporting Cavalry brigades, and were expected to be engaged in mobile open warfare. It was developed in parallel with the QF 18-pounder used by Royal Field Artillery.

The original Mk I barrel was wire wound. Later Mk II barrels had a tapered inner A tube which was pressed into the outer tube. A hydro-spring recoil system was mounted above the barrel. The carriage was a pole trail type with two seats for the gunners and a protective shield.

The first British artillery round on the Western Front in World War I was fired by No. 4 gun of E Battery Royal Horse Artillery on 22 August 1914, northeast of Harmignies in Belgium.

It saw action most famously at the Battle of Le Cateau in August 1914 as the British Expeditionary Force retreated from Mons.

It was used to great effect by "L" Bty, Royal Horse Artillery in its famous defensive action on September 1, 1914, at Néry, France, for which three Victoria Crosses were awarded. The medals, and No. 6 gun and limber involved in this action, are held in the collection of the Imperial War Museum.

From late 1914, when the Western Front settled into trench warfare, the 13-pounder was found to be too light to be truly effective against prepared defensive positions. As a result, a few RHA batteries that were not supporting cavalry formations converted to 18-pounder guns and 4.5-inch howitzers. However, it was retained in the British and Canadian cavalry brigades on the Western Front. and also used throughout the war in batteries (both RHA and Territorial Force) supporting cavalry and mounted formations in Palestine and Mesopotamia.

Batteries normally carried 176 rounds per gun. All members of the gun detachments were mounted on their own horses.

As the war progressed the increasing air activity created a requirement for a medium anti-aircraft gun. Some 13-pounders were slightly modified to become "Ordnance QF 13 pdr Mk III" and mounted on high-angle mounts to produce what became known as the 13-pounder 6 cwt anti-aircraft gun.

In 1940, some 13-pounders were brought out of store for use as emergency anti-tank guns, mounted in pill boxes, for the home defence of Britain against possible German invasion.

For combat purposes the gun is obsolete, but remains in service with the King's Troop, Royal Horse Artillery for ceremonial purposes and as state saluting guns.

13-pounder 6 cwt QF Mark V naval gun 
This was a pedestal-mounted adaptation by Vickers Limited of the Mark I horse artillery gun, intended to arm the Royal Navy's new Motor Launches in World War I. 650 examples were constructed, including 250 made in the United States. Because of the German U-boat campaign, many of the guns were used on defensively equipped merchant ships, some being removed from motor launches for that purpose.

Ammunition

Surviving examples 

 With the King's Troop, Royal Horse Artillery, London
 Imperial War Museum collection:
The Néry Gun and limber, used during the action at Néry, 1 September 1914.
No.4 Gun, E Battery Royal Horse Artillery; fired the first British artillery round on the Western Front, August 1914.
 Canadian War Museum, Ottawa
 Fort de Seclin – 1914/1918 Museum (near Fromelles)
 Musee des Abris, Albert, France. (Mk. 2)
 There are six examples in South Africa:
 One restored in 2009,
 One at THA HQ in Johannesburg,
 Two with the NFA in Durban,
 Two at the National Memorial in Potchefstroom.
 Mark V naval gun recovered from a sunken merchant ship, is on display at the harbour in Scarborough, North Yorkshire.
 There is one example on display in the Tsumeb Museum in Namibia. The gun was used by the THA at the Battle of Sandfontein on 26 September 1914 and was captured by German troops and later dumped into Lake Otjikoto prior to the German surrender in June 1915.

Popular culture 
A QF 13-pounder features in the Big Guns (Dad's Army), where it is supplied to the Walmington-on-Sea platoon for home defence.

See also 
 Edward Kinder Bradbury
 George Thomas Dorrell
 David Nelson
 List of field guns
 QF 13-pounder 6 cwt AA gun: WWI improvised anti-aircraft version
 QF 13-pounder 9 cwt: later WWI anti-aircraft version (18-pounder gun modified to fire 13-pounder shell with 18-pounder cartridge)

References

Notes

Sources

 Dale Clarke, British Artillery 1914–1919. Field Army Artillery. Osprey Publishing, Oxford UK, 2004
 Cruickshank, Dan, Invasion – Defending Britain from Attack. Boxtree, 2001 
 General Sir Martin Farndale, History of the Royal Regiment of Artillery Western Front 1914–18. Published by Royal Artillery Institution, 1986. 
 General Sir Martin Farndale, History of the Royal Regiment of Artillery, The Forgotten Fronts and the Home Base 1914–18, Published by Royal Artillery Institution, 1988.  
 
 I.V. Hogg & L.F. Thurston, British Artillery Weapons & Ammunition 1914–1918. published by Ian Allan, London, 1972.

Further reading

External links 

 The Affair at Néry, 1 September 1914. With map, illustrations and photographs
 

Naval guns of the United Kingdom
QF 13 pounder
QF 13 pounder
QF 13 pounder
QF 13 pounder